Yawm Sa'id  (Happy Day) is a 1939 Egyptian drama film directed by Mohammed Karim and starring Egyptian actor and musician Mohamed Abdel Wahab. This was also the first movie that Faten Hamama, who was only eight years old then, acted in.

Plot 
Abdel Wahab plays the role of a young man who is unlucky to be fired from his job. He meets a beautiful lady and falls in love with her. The lady's parents do not approve of the man. The young man earns a good reputation and becomes famous and a rich lady, secretly having a crush for him, asks him for music lessons, only to get closer to him. The rich lady discovers that he is in love with another woman and tries to ruin their relationship, but fails and the lovers remain together. After what happens, the lady's parents are convinced of the man's loyalty and love so they accept him as her husband.

Cast 
 Mohamed Abdel Wahab
 Faten Hamama
 Samiha Samih

References

External links
 

1939 films
1930s Arabic-language films
1939 drama films
Films directed by Mohammed Karim
Egyptian drama films
Egyptian black-and-white films